Uranienborg church is a parish church in Oslo, Norway.

The church is situated in the neighborhood  of Uranienborg, next to Uranienborg Park behind the Royal Palace. 
Both the church and Uranienborg school just below were constructed in 1886. The church was built of brick and was the most expensive of all churches erected within Christiania (now Oslo) at this time. The church was designed by Balthazar Lange who was city architect in Christiania from 1898 to 1920.  It was consecrated on 22 December 1886.  The building is given a Gothic feel and was decorated with stained glass by the artist Emanuel Vigeland. The church was initially decorated with frescoes by Enevold Thømt, which have since been lost. In 1930 the interior received its present form by architect Arnstein Arneberg. The church has 1020 seats.

Gallery

References 

Lutheran churches in Oslo
Churches completed in 1886
1886 establishments in Norway
19th-century Church of Norway church buildings